Baron Auguste de Méritens was a French electrical engineer of the 19th century.

He was born in 1834.

He is best known his work on magneto generators, particularly those used for arc lighting and lighthouses. Similar magneto generators had been produced earlier by Nollet; de Méritens' innovation was to replace the rotor coils previously wound on individual bobbins, with a 'ring wound' armature. These windings were wound on a segmented iron core, similar to a Gramme ring, so as to form a single continuous hoop. This gave a more even output current, which was advantageous for use with arc lamps.

In 1881 he was awarded a French patent for the first arc welding process. This used a carbon electrode to generate an arc to the workpiece. The process achieved relatively low temperatures and was not successful with steel. However it was widely used commercially, for welding lead plates to manufacture storage batteries. De Méritens produced this welding equipment with an enclosed hood and fume extraction pipe, to control the hazardous lead oxide fumes from the hot lead.

He poisoned himself after having run bankrupt at Eragny-sur-Oise in the last days of October 1898.

Patents 
 10 April 1878, French patent no. 123,766 (improved magneto-electric generator).
 17 September 1878, British patent no. 3,658 (improved magneto-electric generator).
 1881, French patent (electric arc welding)

Further reading 
  (a description of the original de Meritens machine).
  (a report on machines in service).

References 

19th-century French inventors
French electrical engineers
1834 births
1898 deaths
1890s suicides
Suicides by poison
Suicides in France